The Central District of Varzaqan County is in East Azerbaijan province, Iran. At the National Census in 2006, its population was 33,955 in 7,619 households. The following census in 2011 counted 34,213 people in 9,133 households. At the latest census in 2016, the district had 35,897 inhabitants in 10,965 households.

References 

Varzaqan County

Districts of East Azerbaijan Province

Populated places in East Azerbaijan Province

Populated places in Varzaqan County